Abellio is a Dutch public transport company that operates bus and rail services in Germany. It was founded as NedRailways in 2001, before being renamed Abellio in January 2010. Abellio is wholly owned by the Dutch national railway company, Nederlandse Spoorwegen. In February 2023, Abellio's UK bus and rail operations were subject to a management buyout and is now called Transport UK Group.

United Kingdom

Abellio began operations in the United Kingdom in 2003, initially through a 59% shareholding in Serco-Abellio and later operating various bus and rail operations in its own right. 

In August 2022, Abellio agreed terms to sell it UK operations to the Transport UK Group, a management buyout led by managing director Dominic Booth, subject to approval by the Office of Rail and Road and partner organisations Merseytravel and Transport for London. The deal was completed in February 2023.

Buses
In May 2009, Abellio purchased the Travel London and Travel Surrey businesses from National Express and rebranded them Abellio London and Abellio Surrey in October 2009. The latter closed in September 2018.

Abellio London operated six garages; Battersea, Beddington Cross, Fulwell, Hayes, Southall and Walworth. As at March 2022, the fleet consisted of 756 buses.

Rail
Abellio had a 50% shareholding in Serco-Abellio that has bid for a number of rail franchises. The joint venture operated the Merseyrail franchise from July 2003. Serco-Abellio also operated the Northern Rail franchise from December 2004 until March 2016. Serco-Abellio also lodged unsuccessful bids for the Wales & Borders, West Midlands and Tyne & Wear Metro franchises.

Abellio also bid for a number of franchises in its own right, lodging bids for the South Western franchise (in partnership with FirstGroup), London Overground, South Central, InterCity West Coast, Essex Thameside, Thameslink, Southern & Great Northern and Northern franchises.

In February 2012, Abellio Greater Anglia commenced operating the East Anglia franchise. In 2016, Abellio successfully bid to retain the renamed East Anglia franchise until 2025.  In January 2017, Abellio sold a 40% stake in the business to Mitsui.

In April 2015, Abellio ScotRail commenced operating the ScotRail franchise. In December 2019 Transport Scotland enacted a break clause to end the 10 year franchise agreement three years early, in 2022 rather than 2025. Ministers cited value for money and the need for financial sustainability as factors in the decision. 

In December 2017, West Midlands Trains, a joint venture with East Japan Railway Company and Mitsui in which Abellio owned 70%, commenced operating the West Midlands franchise.

In February 2018, Abellio withdrew from a bid for the Wales & Borders franchise. This bid had been undertaken in partnership with Carillion, but the liquidation of the latter left it without an infrastructure partner.

In August 2019, Abellio commenced operating the East Midlands Railway franchise.

Germany
Abellio Deutschland was initially established by EVAG, the city council-owned public transit company of Essen, in 2004. In December 2005, British investment company Star Capital Partners purchased a 75% share in Abellio from the City of Essen. In December 2008, both sold their shares to NedRailways. The Abellio brand was later rolled out to replace the NedRailways brand internationally.

Bus
In April 2013, Abellio Deutschland announced it would focus on rail transport and sell its three bus companies. In November 2013 VM and Werner were sold to Transport Capital with 220 buses. The remaining KVG business was sold to Rhenus Veniro and the District of Bautzen in October 2014 with 84 buses.

Rail
As of April 2020, Abellio Deutschland operates 50 lines in nine states amounting to 5,518 km with a fleet of 278 trains. Abellio Deutschland owned a 25% share in WestfalenBahn that was founded in 2005. In July 2017 this was increased to 100%.

The Netherlands
Qbuzz was founded in 2008 by two former Connexxion directors with Abellio having a 49% shareholding. Abellio purchased the remaining 51% in April 2013.

In March 2015, Qbuzz was awarded a 15-year concession to operate services in the province of Limburg from December 2016. However, after the discovery of irregularities during the tender process, the contract was awarded to Arriva. In July 2016, Nederlandse Spoorwegen announced its intention to sell Qbuzz. In July 2017 it was sold to Ferrovie dello Stato Italiane subsidiary Busitalia.

Czech Republic
Abellio bought Probo Bus and ran its network in the Czech Republic in 2009. It consisted of regional bus transport in the Beroun District and surroundings and some long-distance bus lines between Prague and South and West Bohemia.

Abellio CZ founded in July 2011. In spring 2012, Abellio CZ lodged an extensive complaint about wrong assignment of the tender to running of fast train line Ostrava – Krnov – Olomouc. The complaints were completely rejected.

In November 2013, Abellio sold Abellio CZ and Probo Bus to Arriva with 110 buses.

References

External links

 
Nederlandse Spoorwegen
Transport companies established in 2001
2001 establishments in the Netherlands